Nasir Group is one of the largest Bangladeshi industrial conglomerates. The industries under this conglomerate include industrial glass, tobacco, printing and packages, light engineering (light bulbs) etc. AK Group was established in the 1977 by Nasir Uddin Biswas, Managing Director and chairman of Nasir Group.

List of companies
 Nasir Biri Industries Limited (NBIL)
 Nasir Tobacco Industries Limited (NTIL)
 Nasir Leaf Tobacco Industries Limited (NLT)
 Nasir Glass (Float) Industries Limited (NGIL)
 Bangladesh Melamine Industries Limited (NTIL)
 Nasir Printing Packaging industries Limited (NPPIL)
 Nasir Glassware & Tube Industries Limited ( NGTIL)
 Bangladesh Footwear Industries Limited (Jump Keds)
 Nasir Energy saving Lamp Industries Limited (NESLIL)
 Biswas Printing & Packaging Industries Limited
 Nasir Starch Company Limited (NSCL)

See also
 List of companies of Bangladesh

References

External links
 Nasir Group's corporate information

Conglomerate companies of Bangladesh